Belén railway station, is a railway station, managed by Incofer, located in San Antonio district, Belén canton, Heredia province, of Costa Rica.

The building, of Victorian inspired design, was built in 1900 as part of the railway to the Pacific, on such decommissioned line, the station was the Number 5. It was restored by the Belén Municipality and Incofer in 2011 for the Interurbano line, at a cost of CRC ₡73.6 million.

References

Rail transport in Costa Rica